Brandsen is a partido in northeastern Buenos Aires Province, Argentina. In 2001 the city and district had a population of about 22,500 people. The capital is also known as Brandsen.

History
The area was named after Argentine colonel, Federico de Brandsen, who was killed in the battle of Ituzaingó in the Cisplatine War.

Settlements

Brandsen
Altamirano
Doyhenard
El Chaja
Gobernador Obligado
Gómez
Jeppener
Las Acacias
Las Golondrinas
Los Bosquecitos
Oliden
Samborombón

References

External links

 
 Brandsen Museum

Partidos of Buenos Aires Province